Suzanne Gardinier (born 1961 in New Bedford, Massachusetts) is an American poet. She is a recipient of the Lannan Literary Award for Poetry.

Life
Gardinier grew up in Scituate, Massachusetts. She completed her B.A. at the University of Massachusetts Amherst in 1981, and her MFA at Columbia University, in 1986. She is the author of a long poem called The New World. She teaches at Sarah Lawrence College, is a member of PEN, and lives in Manhattan.

Her work appears in The Kenyon Review, The Paris Review, Ploughshares, and AGNI.

Awards
The New World won the Associated Writing Program's Award Series in poetry in 1992. Suzanne has also received awards from the New York Foundation for the Arts, the Lannan Foundation, and the Kenyon Review Award for Excellence in the Essay.

Work

Poetry
 Usahn: Ten Poems and a Story, (Grand Street Books, 1990)
 The New World, (Pittsburgh 1993)
 Today:101 Ghazals, (Sheep Meadow Press, 2008)
 Dialogue with the Archipelago, (Sheep Meadow Press, 2009)
Iridium and Selected Poems (Sheep Meadow Press, 2010)

Essays
 
 
 A World That Will Hold All the People (University of Michigan Press 1996)

Anthologies

Reviews
SOMETIMES it seems sweetness exists in a voice. A child who sang, for whom life had no business being sweet. "I had the fortune to sing well, and to sing in the church choir from the age of 5 until I was 16," said the young poet Suzanne Gardinier, whose new book of poems was awarded the yearly Pitt Poetry Prize by the University of Pittsburgh Press, who in it has taken on the choral voices of both city and land, as she circles the 50-mile radius from the foot of the statue of Columbus in Columbus Circle, and then out through New Jersey, New York and Long Island, calling back the ghosts of harvests past and trades untenable, and the souls of new immigrants just coming.

It is a book that does not look flinchingly at violence, whether between schoolchildren for whom nobody "turned a face to them judged/ their dispute wiped their cheeks sent them back to their lessons," or the men who cruelly, sensuously fight one another outside bars, the soldiers who forget even the old Greek sensuality of why they are fighting.

References

External links
Fruitful Place/Perishing World
Suzanne Gardinier Visits Woman-Stirred Radio, September 25, 2008
"The Ghazal: A Poem of Longing" Angela Kim, APRIL 26, 2008, American Public Radio
Suzanne Gardinier, Sheep Meadow Press
The New World, Octopus Magazine, ZS, Issue 4
Suzanne Gardinier. Sag Harbor, NY., NYPL Digital Gallery

Sarah Lawrence College faculty
University of Massachusetts Amherst alumni
Columbia University School of the Arts alumni
1961 births
Living people
21st-century American poets
21st-century American women writers
20th-century American poets
20th-century American women writers
American women academics